Madison is a city in and the county seat of Madison County, Nebraska, United States.  The population was 2,283 at the 2020 census.

History
Madison was founded in 1867. It was named from Madison County. Madison was designated county seat in 1875.

Geography
Madison is located at  (41.827527, -97.456875), just west of the junction of U.S. Route 81 and Nebraska Highway 32.

Madison lies at an elevation of 1580 ft (482 m) above sea level.

Demographics

Madison is part of the Norfolk, Nebraska Micropolitan Statistical Area.

2010 census
As of the census of 2010, there were 2,438 people, 760 households, and 550 families residing in the city. The racial makeup of the city was 65.3% White, 1.0% African American, 1.0% Native American, 0.3% Asian, 30.3% from other races, and 2.1% from two or more races. Hispanic or Latino of any race were 48.8% of the population.

There were 760 households, of which 42.8% had children under the age of 18 living with them, 55.3% were married couples living together, 11.7% had a female householder with no husband present, 5.4% had a male householder with no wife present, and 27.6% were non-families. 23.0% of all households were made up of individuals, and 11.3% had someone living alone who was 65 years of age or older. The average household size was 2.99 and the average family size was 3.56.

The median age in the city was 32 years. 31.6% of residents were under the age of 18; 9.4% were between the ages of 18 and 24; 25.5% were from 25 to 44; 21.6% were from 45 to 64; and 11.7% were 65 years of age or older. The gender makeup of the city was 50.8% male and 49.2% female.

2000 census
As of the census of 2000, there were 2,367 people, 749 households, and 533 families residing in the city. The population density was 2,072.1 people per square mile (801.7/km). There were 802 housing units at an average density of 702.1 per square mile (271.6/km). The racial makeup of the city was 75.37% White, 0.63% African American, 0.17% Native American, 0.21% Asian, 0.08% Pacific Islander, 22.48% from other races, and 1.06% from two or more races. Hispanic or Latino of any race were 33.88% of the population.

There were 749 households, out of which 39.9% had children under the age of 18 living with them, 58.7% were married couples living together, 7.5% had a female householder with no husband present, and 28.8% were non-families. 25.2% of all households were made up of individuals, and 14.6% had someone living alone who was 65 years of age or older. The average household size was 2.93 and the average family size was 3.51.

In the city, the population was spread out, with 29.8% under the age of 18, 10.4% from 18 to 24, 28.3% from 25 to 44, 16.1% from 45 to 64, and 15.4% who were 65 years of age or older. The median age was 33 years. For every 100 females, there were 108.9 males. For every 100 females age 18 and over, there were 105.9 males.

As of 2000 the median income for a household in the city was $35,758, and the median income for a family was $40,733. Males had a median income of $25,550 versus $21,386 for females. The per capita income for the city was $14,620. About 9.5% of families and 14.3% of the population were below the poverty line, including 22.1% of those under age 18 and 5.8% of those age 65 or over.

Economy
The largest single employer in Madison is the Tyson Fresh Meats pork-processing plant, with 1,200 full-time employees.  Other major employers are Countryside Home, a nursing home with 93 full-time and 51 part-time employees; Madison City Schools, with 97 full-time employees; and D&D Industries, a manufacturer of wood pallets with 40 full-time employees.

Climate
This climatic region is typified by large seasonal temperature differences, with warm to hot (and often humid) summers and cold (sometimes severely cold) winters.   According to the Köppen Climate Classification system, Madison has a humid continental climate, abbreviated "Dfa" on climate maps.

Notable people
 Horace L. McBride, lieutenant general in the U.S. Army and commander of the 80th Infantry Division in Europe during World War II
 Armitage Trail, (1902-1930) author of Scarface, born in Madison but his family moved away soon after

See also
Impact of the 2019–20 coronavirus pandemic on the meat industry in the United States

References

External links
 City of Madison

 
Cities in Nebraska
Cities in Madison County, Nebraska
County seats in Nebraska
Norfolk Micropolitan Statistical Area
Populated places established in 1867
1867 establishments in Nebraska